Ma Yuan may refer to:

 Ma Yuan (Han dynasty) (14 BC – 49 AD), general of the Han dynasty
 Ma Yuan (painter) ( 1160–1225), painter of the Song dynasty
 Ma Yuan (judge), a former Vice President of the Supreme People's Court of China